The  was fought on August 27 to August 28 of 1582 on Shikoku island between the Chōsokabe clan and the Miyoshi clan.

History 
The armies met on the banks of the Nakatomigawa on August 27, with the Chōsokabe army of 23,000 men enjoying a clear numerical superiority. The next day Chōsokabe Motochika sent 20,000 of his men against the Miyoshi army across the river and after fierce fighting the Miyoshi were defeated, suffering 800 dead while the Chōsokabe had 600 casualties.

References 

Nakatomigawa 1582
1582 in Japan
Chōsokabe clan
Nakatomigawa